Vadim Viktorovich Demchog (born Menshikh, born 13 March 1963) is a Russian theater and film actor, candidate of psychological sciences, teacher, creator of author projects on radio, television, the Internet and in the theater. He gained fame as a host of Frankie Show on the Silver Rain Radio. The author of more than three hundred scenarios (part in co-authorship). He is the author of five books, the creator of the concept of Self-liberating Game, which unites the theory and practice of the world theater with transpersonal psychology. Currently he directs the theatrical project Harlequinada. The most famous role of the venereologist Kupitman in the comedy series Interns. Also Vadim Demchog became the voice of the character of the animated web series Mr. Freeman. Permanent speaker of the Summer Campus of the Presidential Academy in Tatarstan.

Selected filmography
   Streets of Broken Lights as kidnapper (2003)
 My Fair Nanny as fireworker Babakhsky (2005)
 Worm as Don Mook (2006)
 Mr. Freeman as Mr. Freeman (2009—present)
 Interns as Ivan Natanovich Kupitman (2010—2016)
 The Superdeep as Dr. Dmitry Grigoriev (2020)

References

External links
 Сайт-визитка Вадима и Вероники Демчог
 
 Официальный сайт «Самоосвобождающаяся игра»

1963 births
Living people
People from Narva
Soviet male actors
Russian male television actors
Russian male stage actors
Russian male film actors
Russian male voice actors
Russian screenwriters
Russian directors
Russian radio personalities
Russian State Institute of Performing Arts alumni
Russian writers
Russian people of Estonian descent